Deighton, Bell, & Company was a British firm of booksellers and publishers located in Cambridge, England. It enjoyed a long and close association with the University of Cambridge. In 1978 it celebrated two centuries in the book business and, along with two other booksellers Heffers and Bowes & Bowes, the firm contributed to "making Cambridge a prestigious centre of bookselling".

Company history
The firm was founded in 1778 by John Deighton (1748-1828), a master bookbinder, and was located in "narrow, early eighteenth-century premises" at the corner of Green and Trinity Streets, Cambridge, which would be the location of the firm for its entire existence. 

John Deighton became a major publisher for Cambridge University and a binder for that university's library. He also gained a reputation as a book retailer with a "remarkable ability to supply foreign books, even in time of war", which was particularly important to the university's library in that era before the introduction of the Uniform Penny Post throughout the United Kingdom and before the coming of the railways to all parts of the country. 

In the years 1813-1827 the firm was operated as a partnership between the founder and his two sons, John Deighton the younger (1791-1854) and Joseph Jonathan Deighton (1792-1848), trading as John Deighton & Sons. Following the elder John Deighton's retirement in 1827, the firm traded as J. & J. J. Deighton. Beginning in 1848, following Joseph's death, the firm traded as J. Deighton.

In 1854 the firm was acquired by the educational publisher George Bell of George Bell & Sons, following which it became known as Deighton, Bell, and Company.

In 1876 it was publishing, jointly with George Bell & Sons and Whittaker & Co., a number of textbook series for the secondary school and university markets. 

During the twentieth century the firm concentrated mainly on bookselling of both new and secondhand books. While its publishing activities had mostly ceased, in 1932 the firm published and distributed F. R. Leavis's literary quarterly Scrutiny. From 1967 the firm devoted itself exclusively to antiquarian bookselling. In 1987 Deighton, Bell, and Co. was acquired by Heffers, which was in turn taken over by the academic book retailer and library supply service, Blackwell's.

Book series
 Bibliotheca Classica
 Cambridge Greek and Latin Texts
 Cambridge School and College Textbook series
 Cambridge Texts with Notes series
 Grammar-School Classics
 Luard Memorial Series
 Proceedings of the Cambridge Antiquarian Society
 Public School Series of Classical Authors

References

Further reading
 Paul Dean, "Bookshops remaindered", The Critic, June 2022.
 Jonathan P. Topham,  "Two centuries of Cambridge publishing and bookselling: a brief history of Deighton, Bell, & Co., 1778-1998, with a checklist of the archive", Transactions of the Cambridge Bibliographical Society, Vol. 11, No. 3 (1998), pp. 350-403.

External links
 Deighton Bell, booksellers at National Archives
 Deighton, Bell & Co: Papers, at Archives Hub
 13 Trinity Street (capturingcambridge.org) - photos and chronology of Deighton, Bell & Co.
 Deighton, Bell & Co. at Jesus College, Cambridge Colections - day-to-day business documents of the firm

Bookshops of the United Kingdom
Antiquarian booksellers
Retail companies established in 1778
Book publishing companies of England